Uqi Saywa (Quechua uqi lead, lead-colored, saywa boundary stone, landmark,) also spelled Oque Sayhua) is a mountain in the Wansu mountain range in the Andes of Peru, about  high. It is situated in the Apurímac Region, Antabamba Province, Antabamba District. Paychi lies north of Paqu Qhawana and northeast of Yana Ranra and Puka Urqu.

References 

Mountains of Peru
Mountains of Apurímac Region